Ratu Meli Bainimarama (24 September 1945 – 30 November 2015) was a Fijian civil servant, who served as chief executive officer (CEO) of the Ministry of Fisheries and Forests. Prior to this appointment, reported by Fiji Live on 25 May 2006, he was CEO of the Fijian Affairs Ministry. Some reports in December 2006, however, indicated that he was still in charge of the Fijian Affairs Ministry.

On 13 December 2006, he was also named Acting CEO of the Fijian Affairs Board (FAB) by his younger brother, Military Commander Commodore Frank Bainimarama, who had seized power in a military coup on 5 December. As Acting CEO of the FAB, he succeeded Adi Litia Qionibaravi, who was dismissed for alleged noncooperation with the military regime. In his new role, Bainimarama supervised the workings of the Secretariat of the Great Council of Chiefs and of the fourteen Provinces.

The Fijian Affairs Board officially appointed Bainimarama as its chief executive officer on 29 January 2007, but as part of a reorganization of the civil service by the interim government, Bainimarama was dismissed, along with twenty-two other Chief Executive Officers, on 21 January 2007 after just one day holding the position formally. He was one of four terminated to be re-employed immediately, as a consultant advising the FAB.

Bainimarama hailed from the village of Kiuva, in the Kaba Peninsula, Tailevu Province.

References

Fijian chiefs
Fijian civil servants
People from Tailevu Province
1945 births
2015 deaths